Gianluca Zavarise (born July 28, 1986) is a Canadian retired soccer player who played as a midfielder.

Career

Club career
Zavarise began his career in Canada with Roman Tulis European Soccer School of Excellence and won the 2003 School Boy Award for the player of the season. In 2004, he left the Roman Tulis European Soccer School of Excellence to sign for Vancouver Olympics.

After one year with Vancouver Olympics he was signed in July 2005 by Italian side Calcio Montebelluna. He played for half a year for Calcio Montebelluna and was signed in February 2007 by Italian Serie D club AC Belluno 1905. He made his first senior appearances for AC Belluno 1905 in the 2007–08 Serie D season. He left Italy and his club AC Belluno 1905 after a half season on January 30, 2008, to sign with German club VfL Bochum II. On May 1, 2010 VfL Bochum confirmed that Zavarise had left the team at the end of the season. After the end of his contract with VfL Bochum II he joined Greek club Iraklis Thessaloniki F.C.

On January 28, 2011 Toronto FC of Major League Soccer verified that Zavarise was one of three Canadian National team trialists that were traveling to Turkey for preseason. On March 11, 2011 Toronto officially announced the signing of Zavarise. Zavarise made his debut for the team as a second half sub on March 19, 2011 against Vancouver Whitecaps, in which was the first all Canadian match-up in the league. Gianluca assisted Maicon Santos in the 74th minute, the game ended as a 4–2 away defeat for Toronto.

Zavarise was waived by Toronto on November 23, 2011.

International career
Zavarise earned his first call-up for Canada on May 14, 2010 for the friendlies against Argentina on May 24, 2010 and Venezuela on May 29, 2010. He did not make an appearance against Argentina but did start in the 1–1 draw versus Venezuela.

Honours

Toronto FC
Canadian Championship (1): 2011

References

External links

1986 births
Living people
Canadian people of Italian descent
Canadian soccer players
Canadian expatriate soccer players
VfL Bochum II players
Iraklis Thessaloniki F.C. players
Toronto FC players
Canadian expatriate sportspeople in Italy
Soccer people from British Columbia
Sportspeople from Burnaby
Expatriate footballers in Germany
Association football midfielders
Expatriate footballers in Italy
Canadian expatriate sportspeople in Germany
Expatriate footballers in Greece
A.C. Belluno 1905 players
Canadian expatriate sportspeople in Greece
Calcio Montebelluna players
Canada men's international soccer players
Major League Soccer players